Events from the year 1901 in art.

Events
 March 12 – Whitechapel Gallery, designed by Charles Harrison Townsend, opens in London as one of the first publicly funded galleries for temporary exhibitions in the city.
 March 17 – Paris: Van Gogh's paintings shown at Bernheim Gallery. 
 May 11 – The Kraków Society of Friends of Fine Arts inaugurates its Palace of Art.
 June 24 – The first exhibit by Pablo Picasso in Paris (19 years old) – The Blue Period.
 Julien-Auguste Hervé exhibits his paintings in Paris under the title Expressionismes.
 The "Red Rose Girls" rent the Red Rose Inn in Villanova, Pennsylvania in the Philadelphia Main Line.
 Swedish-born painter Carl Oscar Borg enters the United States as a stowaway.

Works

 Sigvald Asbjørnsen – Statue of Leif Erikson (Chicago)
John Collier – In the Venusberg Tannhauser
 Frank Cadogan Cowper – An Aristocrat answering the Summons to Execution, Paris 1791
 Thomas Eakins – Portrait of Leslie W. Miller
 Albert Edelfelt – Portrait of the opera singer Aino Ackté
 Joseph Farquharson – Beneath the Snow Encumbered Branches
 Stanhope Forbes – The 22nd January 1901: Reading the News of Queen Victoria’s Death in a Cornish Cottage
 Paul Gauguin – Still Life with Hope
 J. W. Godward
 At The Garden Door
 Chloris
 Winslow Homer – Searchlight on Harbor Entrance, Santiago de Cuba

 Gustav Klimt
 Buchenwald (Birkenwald)
 Judith and the Head of Holofernes
 Music (lithograph)
 Edmund Leighton – The Accolade
 Max Liebermann – Two Riders on the Beach (two versions)
 Maximilien Luce – The Quai Saint-Michel and Notre-Dame
 Adolfo Müller-Ury – portrait of Lulu Pfizer
 Giuseppe Pellizza da Volpedo – The Fourth Estate (Il quarto stato, originally entitled The path of workers)
 Pablo Picasso - too many to list - see List of Picasso artworks 1901–1910
 Blue Roofs
 Portrait of Gustave Coquiot
 The Wait (Margot)
 Camille Pissarro
 Hay Harvest at Éragny
 Morning, Winter Sunshine, Frost, the Pont-Neuf, the Seine, the Louvre (approximate date)
 Henrietta Rae – portrait of Lord Dufferin
 Ilya Repin – Leo Nikolayevich Tolstoy Barefoot
 Walter Sickert – The Rialto
 Douglas Tilden – Mechanics Monument (San Francisco, California)
 Anders Zorn
 Freya
 Stickande kulla, Kål-Margit ("Girl from Dalecarlia Knitting")

Births

January to June
 7 January – Fahrelnissa Zeid, Turkish abstract artist (d. 1991).
 9 January – Chic Young, American cartoonist (d. 1973).
 24 January – Cassandre, born Adolphe Jean-Marie Mouron, Ukrainian-born French graphic designer (d. 1968).
 28 January – Richmond Barthé, African-American sculptor (d. 1989).
 22 March – Greta Kempton, Austrian-American artist (d. 1991).
 24 March – Ub Iwerks, American animator, cartoonist and special effects technician (d. 1971).
 27 March – Carl Barks, American illustrator and comic book creator (d. 2000).
 7 April – Christopher Wood, English painter (suicide 1930).
 9 June – John Skeaping, English sculptor and equine painter (d. 1980).

July to December
 July 5 – Len Lye, New Zealand-born kinetic sculptor and filmmaker (d. 1980).
 July 15 – Pyke Koch, Dutch painter (d. 1991).
 July 31 – Jean Dubuffet, French painter and sculptor (d. 1985).
 August 29 – Anna Zinkeisen, Scottish-born artist (died 1976)
 September 14 – Lucien Aigner, Hungarian photographer (d. 1999).
 October 2 – Alice Prin ("Kiki de Montparnasse"), French artists' model and painter (d. 1953).
 October 10 – Alberto Giacometti, Swiss sculptor (d. 1966)
 November 7 – Norah McGuinness, Irish painter and illustrator (d. 1980)
 November 11 – Richard Lindner, German-American painter (d. 1978)
 December 1 – Charles Tunnicliffe, British wildlife painter (d. 1979)
 December 5 – Walt Disney, American cartoonist, animator and filmmaker (d. 1966)
 December 27 – Stanley Hayter, English-born printmaker  (d. 1988)
 December 30 – Beauford Delaney, American modernist painter (d. 1979)

Full date unknown
 Roland Ansieau, French graphic artist (d. 1987)
 Michael Cardew, English studio potter (d. 1983)
 Dorothy Dehner, American sculptor (d. 1994)
 Philip Evergood, American painter, printmaker and sculptor (d. 1973)
 Albert Swinden, English-born American painter (d. 1961)

Deaths
 January 9 – Edward Mitchell Bannister, African American Tonalist painter (b. 1828)
 January 17 – Paul Hankar, Belgian sculptor, designer and architect (b. 1859)
 February 21 – Henry Peach Robinson, English photographer (b. 1830)
 March 6 – John Jabez Edwin Mayall, English photographer (b. 1813)
 March 17 – Jean-Charles Cazin, French landscape painter and ceramicist (b. 1840)
 May 2 – Blaise Alexandre Desgoffe, French still-life painter (b. 1830)
 June 5 – Dagny Juel, Norwegian-born artists' model (b. 1867) (shot)
 June 8 – Edward Moran, English-born American marine painter (b. 1829)
 September 9 – Henri de Toulouse-Lautrec, French painter (b. 1864)
 October 24 – James McDougal Hart, Scottish-born American painter (b. 1828)
 November 6 – Kate Greenaway, English illustrator (b. 1846)
 December 23 – Edward Onslow Ford, English sculptor (b. 1852)

References

 
Years of the 20th century in art
1900s in art